Kneafsey is a surname. Notable people with the surname include:

Honor Kneafsey (born 2004), British actress
Tamsin Dunwoody-Kneafsey (born 1958), British politician